Great Jones Street a street in New York City's NoHo district in Manhattan.

Great Jones Street may also refer to:
Great Jones Street (novel), a 1973 novel by Don DeLillo
"Great Jones Street", a song by Luna from Bewitched